The U.S. Bureau of Mines (USBM), developed by Donaldson et al. in 1969,  is a method to measure wettability of petroleum reservoir rocks.

USBM index is positive for water-wet rocks, and negative for oil-wet systems.

Bounded USBM (or USBM*) 
The USBM index is theoretically unbounded and can vary from negative infinity to positive infinity. Since other wettability indices such as Amott-Harvey, Lak wettability index and modified Lak are bounded in the range of -1 to 1, Abouzar Mirzaei-Paiaman highlighted the bounded form of USBM (called USBM*) as a replacement of the traditional USBM as 

USBM* varies from -1 to 1 for strongly oil-wet and strongly water-wet rocks, respectively.

See also
 Wetting
 Amott test
 Lak wettability index

References 

Petroleum geology
Surface science
Fluid mechanics